Anterior cerebral artery syndrome is a condition whereby the blood supply from the anterior cerebral artery (ACA) is restricted, leading to a reduction of the function of the portions of the brain supplied by that vessel: the medial aspects of the frontal and parietal lobes, basal ganglia, anterior fornix and anterior corpus callosum.

Depending upon the area and severity of the occlusion, signs and symptoms may vary within the population affected with ACA syndrome. Blockages to the proximal (A1) segment of the vessel produce only minor deficits due to the collateral blood flow from the opposite hemisphere via the anterior communicating artery. Occlusions distal to this segment will result in more severe presentation of ACA syndrome. Contralateral hemiparesis and hemisensory loss of the lower extremity is the most common symptom associated with ACA syndrome.

Signs and symptoms

 Hemiparesis or hemiplegia contralaterally, involving primarily the lower limbs and pelvic floor musculature
 Sensory deficits contralaterally, involving primarily the leg and perineum
 Apraxia (due to branches to the supplementary motor area and corpus callosum)
 Disconnection syndrome (due to callosal branches)
 Anosmia (due to branches of the olfactory bulb and olfactory tract)
 Urinary incontinence
 Grasp reflex and or sucking reflex contralaterally (if circle of Willis compromised)

Diagnosis
Once an acute ischemic stroke is suspected, the standard evaluation includes performing routine airway, breathing and circulation assessment, checking blood glucose, performing a validated stroke severity scale assessment and accurate, focused history regarding the time of symptom onset or last known well or at baseline. The National Institutes of Health Stroke Scale (NIHSS) is a standardized method for quantifiable assessment of stroke symptoms. It is the preferred scoring system, and scores range from 0 to 42. A patient with a higher score on this scale is more likely to be considered disabled; however, the definition of "disabling" depends on age, occupation, underlying life-limiting comorbidities, advance directives.

The crucial step in the evaluation of stroke patients is to obtain brain imaging to ascertain the type and characteristics of the stroke. In this regard, non-contrast CT of the head is the imaging modality of choice. Ischemic changes may classify as acute, subacute, and chronic, depending on the time in which they present after the onset of stroke. CT scan can also rule out intracranial hemorrhage.[18] If an intracranial hemorrhage is present, aneurysmal rupture should be investigated given its association with arterial vasospasm resulting in stroke.[3] Anterior cerebral artery strokes could be missed on imaging studies depending on their location or size. One case series found that 37.5% (6 of 16) of ACA infarcts evaluated by CT were identifiable only after using contrast injection or angiography. If the area of hypodensity is small and localized over a sulcus, the infarct could be overlooked.[1] [13]  Noncontrast head CT should be quickly followed by CT angiography of the head and neck to expedite identification of intracranial large vessel occlusion.

The finding of a hyperdense lesion in the ACA on CT scan aid in the diagnosis of stroke in its acute phase, particularly when it may be otherwise difficult to establish. The frequency of this sign in ACA infarcts is similar to that in the territories of the middle cerebral artery and the posterior circulation.[19]

As in strokes involving other areas of the brain, magnetic resonance imaging is also of critical value in the diagnosis of ACA strokes. MRI with diffusion-weight imaging is a highly useful modality, which facilitates the demarcation of ischemic boundaries in the territory of the ACA.[3] [18] MR angiography can be a helpful adjunct in the evaluation of stroke mechanisms.[7] The goal of completing head CT or MRI should be 25 min or less within patient arrival.

The National Institutes of Neurological Disorders and Stroke (NINDS) established time frame goals in the evaluation of stroke patients: door to physician less than 10 min, door to stroke team less than 15 min, door to CT scan less than 25 min, door to drug less than 60 min.[20]

Along with accurate history and early imaging, laboratory studies including capillary blood glucose, complete blood count with platelets, chemistries, coagulation studies, hemoglobin A1c, lipid panel, and markers of hypercoagulability or inflammation can be useful in identifying the risk factors or establishing the etiology of stroke. The medication checklist is an integral part of the evaluation, specifically recent use of anticoagulants, as contraindications to thrombolytic therapy should undergo rapid assessment. Cardiac sources of embolism can be evaluated as part of the work up with EKG monitoring and echocardiogram.

Management
Pulse oximetry can guide the use of supplemental oxygen to maintain oxygen saturation greater than 94%. Hyperoxia should be avoided as may be detrimental in stroke. Hypertension is common in an acute ischemic stroke. A low BP is uncommon and may indicate symptoms exacerbation of a previous stroke due to poor perfusion. Blood pressure of 220/120 mmHg should receive treatment. There is a consensus approach of allowing permissive hypertension up to 220/120 mmHg for patients that are not candidates for thrombolysis.[21]

However, for a patient that is a potential candidate for alteplase, attempt to control BP should be made immediately as goal BP for initiation of IV alteplase is 185/110 mmHg. Usually, titratable short-acting intravenous hypotensive agents are recommended to avoid dropping the BP too much once the patient is at goal. Hypotensive agents that can be options include labetalol, nicardipine, clevidipine, hydralazine, enalaprilat.[21]

For the patients that present within the therapeutic window, the decision to treat with intravenous recombinant tissue plasminogen (less than 4.5 hours from symptom onset) or endovascular treatment with mechanical thrombectomy should be made. Initiation of IV alteplase treatment in the 3 to 4.5-hour window is the current recommendation for patients less than 80 years of age, no history of both diabetes mellitus and prior stroke, use of anticoagulants, and NIHSS score of less than 25.  Only patients with disabling symptoms are considered eligible for thrombolytic treatment. Eligibility and absolute and relative contraindications should undergo rapid assessment. Randomized controlled trials have shown that intravenous administration of recombinant tissue plasminogen activator (alteplase) decrease functional disability with an absolute reduction risk of 7%-13% relative to placebo.[21]

Unfortunately, over half of patients arrive after this time window has closed and are not eligible for thrombolysis. Treatment delays may result from failure to ascribe a patient's symptoms to stroke, and furthermore, the risk of harm increases with time elapsed from symptom onset.[21] This situation could be of particular concern in ACA strokes, given their sometimes atypical presentation.

Endovascular treatment with mechanical thrombectomy (MT) is another proven treatment modality in the management of patients with acute stroke suffering a large vessel occlusion, although treatment efficacy is highly time-dependent.  The procedure is available in tertiary hospitals as requires stroke team with the expertise to use timely imaging and intervention. One study evaluating MT in ACA stroke patients found that while recanalization rates were high, the outcomes were otherwise unsatisfactory. The latter was attributed to larger infarct volumes and longer times to recanalization.[22] [23].

New guidelines recommend that in patients with acute ischemic stroke within 6 to 24 hours from last known well and who have large vessel occlusion in anterior circulation, obtaining CTP, DW-MRI, or MRI perfusion is recommended to aid in selection for mechanical thrombectomy. However, this is only with the strict application of imaging or other eligibility criteria from RCTs showing benefit are in selecting patients for MT. The DAWN trial used clinical imaging mismatch (imaging from CTP or DW-MRI and NIHSS scoring) as criteria to select patients with anterior circulation LVO for MT between 6 and 24 hours from last known well. The trial demonstrated an overall functional benefit at 90 days in the treatment group (mRS score 0 to 2, 49% versus 13%, adjusted difference 33%, 95% CI, 21 to 44; a probability of superiority greater than 0.999). The DEFUSE 3 trial used perfusion core mismatch and maximum core size as criteria in selecting the patient for MT with LVO in anterior circulation 6 to 16 hours from last time seen normal. This trial also showed outcome benefit at 90 days in the treated group (mRS score 0 to 2, 44.6% vs. 16.7%, RR 2.67, 95% CI, 1.60 to 4.48, p greater than 0.0001). DAWN and DEFUSE 3 are the only trials showing a benefit of mechanical thrombectomy greater than 6 hours from symptoms onset. Only criteria from these trials should be viable for patient selection who might benefit from MT.[21] One should be aware that most of the patients involved in DAWN and DEFUSE 3 trials had middle cerebral artery occlusions.

Beyond the acute management of stroke, the use of antihypertensives, dual antiplatelet therapy, anticoagulants, carotid endarterectomy should be used to prevent recurrent events. Antiplatelet therapy or anticoagulants are not recommended within 24h after alteplase administration. Aspirin is not a recommendation as a substitute for other interventions for acute stroke. Administration of glycoprotein IIb/IIIa receptor inhibitor is not recommended, and a recent Cochrane review showed that these agents correlated with a high risk of intracranial hemorrhage. Dual antiplatelet therapy (aspirin and clopidogrel) are recommended to start within 24 hours for 21 days in patients with minor stroke for early secondary stroke prevention. The CHANCE trial showed that the primary outcome of recurrent stroke at 90 days favored dual antiplatelet therapy over Aspirin alone (HR 0.68; 95% CI, 0.57 to 0.81, p<0.0001). Ticagrelor over aspirin in acute stroke treatment is not recommended. According to SOCRATES trial with the primary outcome of time to the composite endpoint of stroke, MI or death up to 90 days, ticagrelor was not found to be superior to aspirin (HR 0.89, 95% CI, 0.78-1.01; p=0.07). However, ticagrelor is a reasonable alternative in patients with contraindication to aspirin. The efficacy of tirofiban and eptifibatide is currently unknown.[21] [20]

Optimization of risk factors is essential for secondary prevention of stroke in order to improve outcomes from the principal event.[21]

References

 Kubis N, Guichard JP, Woimant F. Isolated anterior cerebral artery infarcts: A series of 16 patients. Cerebrovasc. Dis. 1999 May-Jun;9(3):185-7. [PubMed]
 Chandra A, Li WA, Stone CR, Geng X, Ding Y. The cerebral circulation and cerebrovascular disease I: Anatomy. Brain Circ. 2017 Apr-Jun;3(2):45-56. [PMC free article] [PubMed]
 Kumral E, Bayulkem G, Evyapan D, Yunten N. Spectrum of anterior cerebral artery territory infarction: clinical and MRI findings. Eur. J. Neurol. 2002 Nov;9(6):615-24. [PubMed]
 Toyoda K. Anterior cerebral artery and Heubner's artery territory infarction. Front Neurol Neurosci. 2012;30:120-2. [PubMed]
 Krishnan M, Kumar S, Ali S, Iyer RS. Sudden bilateral anterior cerebral infarction: unusual stroke associated with unusual vascular anomalies. Postgrad Med J. 2013 Feb;89(1048):120-1. [PubMed]
 Arboix A, García-Eroles L, Sellarés N, Raga A, Oliveres M, Massons J. Infarction in the territory of the anterior cerebral artery: clinical study of 51 patients. BMC Neurol. 2009 Jul 09;9:30. [PMC free article] [PubMed]
 Kang SY, Kim JS. Anterior cerebral artery infarction: stroke mechanism and clinical-imaging study in 100 patients. Neurology. 2008 Jun 10;70(24 Pt 2):2386-93. [PubMed]
 Hensler J, Jensen-Kondering U, Ulmer S, Jansen O. Spontaneous dissections of the anterior cerebral artery: a meta-analysis of the literature and three recent cases. Neuroradiology. 2016 Oct;58(10):997-1004. [PubMed]
 Mohindra S, Kovai P, Chhabra R. Fatal Bilateral ACA Territory Infarcts after Pituitary Apoplexy: A Case Report and Literature Review. Skull Base. 2010 Jul;20(4):285-8. [PMC free article] [PubMed]
 Kurre W, Vorlaender K, Aguilar-Pérez M, Schmid E, Bäzner H, Henkes H. Frequency and relevance of anterior cerebral artery embolism caused by mechanical thrombectomy of middle cerebral artery occlusion. AJNR Am J Neuroradiol. 2013 Aug;34(8):1606-11. [PubMed]
 Nagaratnam N, Davies D, Chen E. Clinical effects of anterior cerebral artery infarction. J Stroke Cerebrovasc Dis. 1998 Nov-Dec;7(6):391-7. [PubMed]
 Bogousslavsky J, Martin R, Moulin T. Homolateral ataxia and crural paresis: a syndrome of anterior cerebral artery territory infarction. J. Neurol. Neurosurg. Psychiatry. 1992 Dec;55(12):1146-9. [PMC free article] [PubMed]
 Honig A, Eliahou R, Auriel E. Confined anterior cerebral artery infarction manifesting as isolated unilateral axial weakness. J. Neurol. Sci. 2017 Feb 15;373:18-20. [PubMed]
 Kobayashi S, Maki T, Kunimoto M. Clinical symptoms of bilateral anterior cerebral artery territory infarction. J Clin Neurosci. 2011 Feb;18(2):218-22. [PubMed]
 Edlow JA, Selim MH. Atypical presentations of acute cerebrovascular syndromes. Lancet Neurol. 2011 Jun;10(6):550-60. [PubMed]
 Nishida Y, Irioka T, Sekiguchi T, Mizusawa H. Pure sensory infarct in the territories of anterior cerebral artery. Neurology. 2010 Jul 20;75(3):287. [PubMed]
 Bejot Y, Caillier M, Osseby GV, Didi R, Ben Salem D, Moreau T, Giroud M. Involuntary masturbation and hemiballismus after bilateral anterior cerebral artery infarction. Clin Neurol Neurosurg. 2008 Feb;110(2):190-3. [PubMed]
 Birenbaum D, Bancroft LW, Felsberg GJ. Imaging in acute stroke. West J Emerg Med. 2011 Feb;12(1):67-76. [PMC free article] [PubMed]
 Jensen UR, Weiss M, Zimmermann P, Jansen O, Riedel C. The hyperdense anterior cerebral artery sign (HACAS) as a computed tomography marker for acute ischemia in the anterior cerebral artery territory. Cerebrovasc. Dis. 2010;29(1):62-7. [PubMed]
 Jauch EC, Saver JL, Adams HP, Bruno A, Connors JJ, Demaerschalk BM, Khatri P, McMullan PW, Qureshi AI, Rosenfield K, Scott PA, Summers DR, Wang DZ, Wintermark M, Yonas H., American Heart Association Stroke Council. Council on Cardiovascular Nursing. Council on Peripheral Vascular Disease. Council on Clinical Cardiology. Guidelines for the early management of patients with acute ischemic stroke: a guideline for healthcare professionals from the American Heart Association/American Stroke Association. Stroke. 2013 Mar;44(3):870-947. [PubMed]
 Powers WJ, Rabinstein AA, Ackerson T, Adeoye OM, Bambakidis NC, Becker K, Biller J, Brown M, Demaerschalk BM, Hoh B, Jauch EC, Kidwell CS, Leslie-Mazwi TM, Ovbiagele B, Scott PA, Sheth KN, Southerland AM, Summers DV, Tirschwell DL., American Heart Association Stroke Council. 2018 Guidelines for the Early Management of Patients With Acute Ischemic Stroke: A Guideline for Healthcare Professionals From the American Heart Association/American Stroke Association. Stroke. 2018 Mar;49(3):e46-e110. [PubMed]
 Musuka TD, Wilton SB, Traboulsi M, Hill MD. Diagnosis and management of acute ischemic stroke: speed is critical. CMAJ. 2015 Sep 08;187(12):887-93. [PMC free article] [PubMed]
 Uno J, Kameda K, Otsuji R, Ren N, Nagaoka S, Kazushi M, Ikai Y, Gi H. Mechanical Thrombectomy for Acute Anterior Cerebral Artery Occlusion. World Neurosurg. 2018 Dec;120:e957-e961. [PubMed]
 Allen CM. Differential diagnosis of acute stroke: a review. J R Soc Med. 1984 Oct;77(10):878-81. [PMC free article] [PubMed]
 Guery D, Ong E, Nighoghossian N. Akinetic mutism reversibility after L-dopa therapy in unilateral left anterior cerebral artery infarction. Neurocase. 2017 Apr;23(2):171-172. [PubMed]

Notes

External links 

Stroke
Syndromes affecting the nervous system